Peter Müllenberg (born 30 December 1987 in Almelo) is an amateur heavyweight boxer from the Netherlands who won silver medals at the 2013 and 2015 European championships.

Career
Müllenberg competed at world championships, including at the 2011 World Amateur Boxing Championships (middleweight), 2013 AIBA World Boxing Championships and 2015 AIBA World Boxing Championships. He was also part of the Dutch team at the 2015 European Games in Baku.

Müllenberg won the silver medal at both the 2013 European Amateur Boxing Championships and 2015 European Amateur Boxing Championships. At the 2016 European Boxing Olympic Qualification Tournament in April 2016 he qualified for the 2016 Summer Olympics after beating Mehmet Ünal in the semi final. He is the first Dutch boxer since 1992 who qualifies for the Summer Olympics. He was eliminated in the second bout at the Olympics.

Personal life
Müllenberg has a son Noah with his ex-partner Essja. Since August 2009 he serves with the Royal Netherlands Army.

Has a son Eymen with his wife Asiye.

References

External links 

 
 
 
 

Sportspeople from Almelo
European Games competitors for the Netherlands
1987 births
Living people
Dutch male boxers
Boxers at the 2015 European Games
Olympic boxers of the Netherlands
Boxers at the 2016 Summer Olympics
Boxers at the 2019 European Games
Light-heavyweight boxers